The Judge Rotenberg Center (founded in 1971 as the Behavior Research Institute) is an institution in Canton, Massachusetts, United States, for people with developmental disabilities, emotional disorders, and autistic-like behaviors. The center has been condemned for torture by the United Nations Special Rapporteur on Torture. The JRC is known for its use of the graduated electronic decelerator (GED), a device that administers electric shocks to residents through a remote control. The device was designed by Matthew Israel, the institute's founder. While the FDA issued a formal ban on the GED in 2020, the device continued to be used on some residents pending an administrative stay for the duration of the COVID-19 pandemic. In July 2021, the D.C. Circuit Court of Appeals ruled that the FDA could not issue a "partial stay" but must issue a blanket ban or no ban at all, thus allowing the JRC to continue using the device on 55 people in the meantime.

The Judge Rotenberg Center's behavior modification program uses the methods of applied behavior analysis and relies heavily on aversion therapy. Aversives used by the JRC include contingent food programs, long-term restraints, sensory deprivation, and GED shocks. While JRC claims to rely mainly on positive behavior support and contends that aversives are used only as a last resort when positive intervention has failed, multiple state reports have found that aversives are used for minor infractions, and that no significant positive behavior support programs exist.

In a video that surfaced in 2011, JRC staff tied a boy with autism face-down to a four-point board and shocked him 31 times at the highest amperage setting. The first shock was given for failing to take off his coat when asked, and the remaining 30 shocks were given for screaming and tensing up while being shocked. The boy was later hospitalized with third degree burns and acute stress disorder, but no action was taken against any of the staff as neither the law nor JRC policy had been broken. In a separate incident, two residents were awoken from their beds at night, restrained, and shocked 29 and 77 times, respectively, due to false allegations that they had misbehaved. The center's founder, Matthew Israel, was indicted on criminal charges for ordering a video of the incident destroyed and was forced to resign his position at the JRC as part of a plea deal to avoid prosecution.

There have been repeated attempts to shut down the center by autism rights advocates, disability rights advocates, and human rights advocates. Organizations that oppose the center include the Autistic Self Advocacy Network, Disability Rights International, and Community Alliance for the Ethical Treatment of Youth. Six residents have died at the institute since it was founded in 1971.

History

1971-1976: Founding and early years 
In 1971, Matthew Israel founded the center as the Behavior Research Institute (BRI) in Providence, Rhode Island. Initially, it had just two residents, one with autism and the other with schizophrenia. In 1975, the BRI expanded to include group homes in Massachusetts, and in 1976 it opened another branch in California.

1976-1981: Behavior Research Institute of California 
Israel opened the California branch of the BRI without a license to operate a group home, without a license to practice psychology in the state of California, and without a license to use aversives. The institute used aversives on residents there nonetheless. When the institute applied for a license to operate in 1977, the California Department of Health rejected the application, citing lack of meaningful peer review and the unnecessary use of painful aversives. The department also found that there was insufficient evidence to show that Israel was "reputable and responsible" and that he had the ability to comply with regulations. Without a license, the center was scheduled to shut down.

The day after the scheduled shutdown, a group of parents reopened the institute as a co-op, moving Israel's official position of executive director to consultant. The organization then changed its name to the Behavior Research Institute of California, and applied for a license to operate a group home and a permit to use aversives. With the aid of then-California governor Pat Brown (whose law firm was hired to represent the center), they received the license to operate, as well as the only permit ever granted by the state of California for a group home to use physical aversives on its residents. The institute was awarded $35,000 a year per child by the state, the highest rate of any community facility in California.

After the 1981 death of a resident, California launched an investigation into the institute and its practices. The investigation revealed various abuses against the residents, both physical and psychological. Residents were beaten, restrained, humiliated, and not adequately fed or cared for. Residents often bore extreme bruising, which staff had been trained to conceal from doctors and family members. As a result of the investigation, the institute was banned from using physical aversives, as well as from using restraints and withholding meals as punishment. Additionally, Matthew Israel was banned from entering the facility. Judy Weber, the mother of one of the institute's residents who would go on to become Israel's second wife, took over the operation of the center and later renamed it as Tobinworld. The center denied all allegations made by the state report.

1981-1994: BRI in Rhode Island and Massachusetts 
As early as 1979, authorities in New York State had published two reports on the Behavior Research Institute in which signs of physical and mental abuse were documented. One report found that the institute's methods were only effective through the means of coercion, and that the residents relapsed into their old behavior as soon as the immediate threat of punishment was gone. While corporal punishment was against the law in Massachusetts, the institute was granted special permission to use aversives in 1983. The institute was welcomed by some state officials due to its near-zero rejection rate. In 1993, the Massachusetts Department of Mental Retardation said that the institution had "repeatedly failed to comply with a number of state regulations" and threatened to take away its certification.

1994-present: Judge Rotenberg Center 
In 1994, the center changed its name to the Judge Rotenberg Educational Center "to honor the memory of the judge [who] helped to preserve [the] program from extinction at the hands of state licensing officials in the 1980s." JRC moved from its original location near Providence, Rhode Island, to its current facilities in Canton, Massachusetts, in 1996. In 2011, Israel was forced to resign from his position as director of the Judge Rotenberg Center as part of a deferred prosecution agreement after being indicted on criminal charges related to the abuse of residents. Six residents have died of preventable causes at the center since it opened in 1971.

As the result of a 2011 ruling by the Massachusetts Department of Early Education and Care, governor Deval Patrick's administration imposed regulations that only residents whose treatment plans approved the GED before that time were still permitted to receive it, but new residents enrolled into the JRC were no longer allowed, by law, to receive the GED as part of their plan.

The Massachusetts Department of Developmental Services is responsible for providing the JRC with its license to use aversives, including electric shocks.

Behavior modification
The Judge Rotenberg Center provides behavioral treatment using the methodologies of Applied Behavior Analysis (ABA). JRC's behavior modification program relies heavily on aversion therapy, with treatment directed exclusively towards promoting normalization. Aversives used to modify behavior include: food deprivation, restraint, solitary confinement, and GED skin shocks.  While the center often claims that it uses aversives only as last resort against self-harm and aggression, these claims have been refuted. Reports by multiple government agencies have found that the center regularly uses aversives on children with no history of self-harm or aggression, often for minor infractions. Several former residents of the center who used to be on the GED have successfully transitioned to positive behavior support programs elsewhere. There is medical consensus that positive-only support is both safer and more effective than the use of aversives.

Aversives

Contingent skin shocks 

The center has stated that the GED was only used as a last resort to prevent violent or self-injurious behavior when positive behavioral support had failed. However, a 2006 report by the New York State Education Department found that the device was regularly used when there was no threat of serious physical harm or injury, including for:
 Failing to be neat
 Wrapping one's foot around the leg of a chair
 Stopping work for more than ten seconds
 Closing one's eyes for more than five seconds
 Minor acts of noncompliance

Other reported reasons for administering shocks included:
 Using the bathroom without permission
 Urinating on oneself after being refused the right to use the bathroom
 Screaming while being shocked
 Attempting to remove the GED

The report also found that despite the center's claims, no significant positive behavioral support program existed.

Additionally, the report found that the GED could be programmed to give automated skin shocks in response to targeted behaviors. For example, some residents were made to sit on GED seats that would automatically administer skin shocks for the target behavior of standing up, while others wore waist holsters that would administer skin shocks if the resident pulled a hand out of the holster. Shocks were administered continuously until the target behavior stopped occurring. The center did not have approval from the United States Food and Drug Administration (FDA) to use the device in this way.

An FDA investigation found that some parents and guardians were pressured into giving consent to put their child on the GED, that they were not provided with accurate information about the device's risks, and that other options were not exhausted before resorting to the GED. The agency also found that the GED could cause both physical and psychological harm, including pain, burns, tissue damage, depression, fear, and aggression. Furthermore, they concluded that the GED device may have caused one resident to enter a catatonic state, and that it can in some cases worsen the behaviors that it claims to treat.

Greg Miller, a former teacher's assistant at the JRC, reported that staff were expected to administer shocks without consideration for the circumstances in which it occurred. Staff were monitored by cameras, and feared losing their jobs if they refused to deliver the expected shocks. "There were no exceptions..." he said. "we had to follow court-approved orders." Residents were made to wear the GED devices at all hours, even during showers and sleep. Residents report that they were sometimes awoken by shocks in the night, which were administered for reasons including nighttime incontinence, tensing up while asleep, and having broken a rule earlier in the day. Resident would also be shocked if they failed to stay awake at daytime. One resident reported that after being shocked while asleep, staff would not explain to her why she was shocked. After the incident, the fear of being shocked in her sleep produced extreme insomnia.William Pelham, a behavioral specialist and director of the Center for Children and Families at the State University of New York at Buffalo, argued that the center's use of electric shocks was harmful and unnecessary. "People don't use... shock anymore because they don't need to. It is not the standard of care. There are alternative procedures that do not involve aversives like electric shock." At the time of the ban, the JRC was the only institution in the United States using electric skin shocks as aversives.

Contingent food program 
In the contingent food program, a resident's food is withheld to be used as a reward for good behavior. If a resident fails to meet all the goals laid out for them by the JRC each meal, they are made to discard the excess food not earned. If a resident fails to meet their daily minimum calorie intake (which may be as little as 20% of their prescribed calories), non-preferred make up food is dispensed to bring them up to the minimum. The non-preferred make up food is designed to be noxious so as to punish the resident; for example, it may be mashed up and sprinkled with liver powder. A 2006 investigation of the JRC concluded that the contingent food program posed an "unnecessary risk" to the residents' growth and development.

Sensory deprivation 
A common sensory deprivation punishment involves forcing a resident to wear a helmet that restricts vision and hearing (through the use of white noise) for an extended period of time. The resident may also be restrained and subjected to other aversives during this time. In 1981, a resident died of asphyxiation during this procedure. The punishment continues to be used.

At least one resident was subjected to a procedure called "isolation-deprivation" in which he was restrained by the wrists and ankles for 24 hours and boxes were stacked so as to prevent him from seeing anything in the room. During this time he received only lettuce with mayonnaise to eat. On some occasions he was not allowed to use the bathroom and was forced to soil his pants. Furthermore, staff were directed to pinch his feet once per hour and spray him with water whenever they walked by.

Movement limitation 

The use of long term restraints is common at the JRC. Many residents are required to carry their own "restraint bags", which contain the materials required to restrain them. Commonly used restraints include the four-point board and the five-point restraint chair. Restraints may be used alone, or in combination with other aversives to hurt residents. For example, one resident's behavior plan specified that he was to receive five GED shocks while restrained to a four-point board as a consequence for pulling the fire alarm.

Behavior rehearsal lessons 
In a behavior rehearsal lesson, a resident is provoked, tricked, or coerced into exhibiting a target behavior (e.g. eating nonfood items, destruction of property) so that the target behavior may be punished. If the resident refuses to perform the target behavior, they are punished for noncompliance, but if they perform the target behavior then they are punished much more harshly for breaking the rules. There is no way for the resident to escape punishment. The resident is repeatedly challenged to perform the behavior, and the lesson does not end until they sit perfectly still for ten minutes. The JRC contends that behavior rehearsal lessons are an effective way of reducing "high risk, low frequency" behaviors.  at least nine residents at the JRC were approved for behavior rehearsal lessons.

Rewards 
In addition to punishments, residents of the center are given the opportunity to earn rewards. State reports have found that despite the institute's claims, its reward programs are minimal. Things considered rewards at the JRC may include verbal praise, the opportunity to look out a window, and sometimes food. A child who cries is not to be given attention, as this is considered a reward, and the child may be punished for crying. One reward that a resident may win is the opportunity to visit the "Big Rewards Store" (BRS). The BRS contains a pool table and various arcade games, and is the only place in the center that residents may socialize freely.

Controversy and investigations
In its 2006 Private Special Education School Program Review Report of Findings, the Massachusetts Department of Education found that unsigned Individualized Education Programs (IEPs) were being utilized for residents at JRC, and that the center did not have a written policy indicating that it must obtain consent before revising or changing an IEP. At various points in its history, investigations and lawsuits have been brought against the center's operations. Matthew Israel has cited Ivar Lovaas's use of a cattle prod on children with autism as justification for the center's use of electric skin shocks.

1979 report 
A 1979 report from the state for New York found that:

As a result of the report, the state of New York restricted the institute's right to use aversives to cases where a resident was a danger to himself or others, and even then only after other means had failed.  However, the institute soon after regained its right to use aversives on New York residents.

1982 report 
In 1979, a staff member resigned and asked the district attorney to file child abuse charges against the institute, alleging that he had observed abuse there. On the prompting of various former staff, residents, and concerned family members, the California Department of Social Services launched an investigation into the institution. The ensuing investigation revealed various abuses by the institute including: improper and unsafe use of restraints, punishments designed to humiliate the residents, failure to provide proper nutrition, failure to provide proper medical care, and severe bruising/lacerations/scars from aversive interventions. In a 1982 report of the investigation, the California Department of Social Services documented various violations and abuses that had occurred at the institute. As a result of the investigation, the state of California revoked the institute's license to use aversives and forbade Matthew Israel from setting foot on the property.

Physical abuse 
The investigation found that residents had received "excessive bruises" from "excessive and unnecessary aversives". Residents had cuts, scars, scabs, and open wounds from the use of aversives. Furthermore, staff took action to disguise these injuries from doctors and family members: Doctor's appointments were sometimes postponed due to the presence of excessive bruising, and aversive interventions were put on hold before scheduled visits with family for "public relations purposes". Residents were made to wear long sleeves to cover up the injuries, and social service employees were on some occasions denied the right to adequately inspect them for bruises.

Residents were often put in positions where there was no way for them to avoid receiving an aversive: For example, deaf children were punished for failing to comply with verbal commands. Residents were also forced to take part in "behavior rehearsal" lessons where they were punished regardless of whether or not they behaved correctly. Additionally, residents were regularly spanked for crying in response to punishment. The report found that at least one resident's behavior substantially worsened at the institute due to "improper treatment" and "unprofessional use of aversives".

Humiliation 
The report found that staff pinched residents to make them repeat phrases uttered by staff, and threatened residents with the use of aversives if they did not comply with the staff's arbitrary demands. One resident was made to eat dinner outside with his arms restrained by his sides from a plate of food that had been placed on the ground. Other residents were deprived of the right to sleep in a bed: One was forced to sleep in a kneeling position while tied to a piece of furniture, while another was made to sleep on the floor with his arms restrained to nearby fixtures. Residents were sometimes made to soil themselves when staff refused to let them use the bathroom.

Restraints 
Residents were restrained for punishment, as well as for the personal convenience of staff. Residents were restrained in unsafe ways, and sometimes received cuts and bruises. In 1981, a fourteen-year boy old died at the institute while restrained face down to a four-point board. The institute was not authorized to use restraints on any resident at this time, and continued to do so even after being informed that it was against the law.

Record keeping and retaliation 
The institute was found to have removed records, making them inaccessible to investigators and family. Furthermore, they were found to have denied the right to view records to family members and investigators. In many cases, the institute's records were inaccurate. Examples include: denying a resident food as punishment while recording that he had been fed, recording that restraints had been checked when they had not been checked, and failing to properly record the administration of aversives. The institute retaliated against people who complained about their practices and refused to let the Department of Social Services investigate those complaints. Parents were told that their children would be expelled if they questioned or complained about the institute.

Before-and-after video 
The investigation found that residents were provoked into violent and aggressive behavior as part of the filming of a before-and-after video, where staged clips of the residents responding to provocation were shown as examples of how they had behaved before treatment. The residents were then taken off aversive therapy, rewarded heavily for several days, and asked to perform only tasks that placed little demand on them so that a video could be produced to show how they behaved after treatment. This film is often shown to parents of prospective residents and to reporters to convince them of the benefits of the institute.

Hoax phone call 
After the center received a phone call alleging that two residents had misbehaved earlier that evening, staff woke them from their beds, restrained them, and repeatedly gave them electric shocks. One of the residents received 77 shocks and the other received 29. After the incident, one of the residents had to be treated for burns. The phone call was later found to be a hoax perpetrated by a former resident who was pretending to be a supervisor. In December 2007, the center was found by the Massachusetts Department of Early Education and Care to have been abusive towards residents and had failed to protect their health.

The incident led to two investigations – one by the federal government, and one by the state of Massachusetts. While the investigation was ongoing, Matthew Israel ordered tapes destroyed, despite a court order to keep them. In May 2011, Israel was indicted on charges of child endangerment, acting as an accessory after the fact, and obstruction of justice for misleading a grand jury over the JRC's destruction of tapes. In 2011, Israel was forced to resign his position at JRC in a deferred prosecution plea deal with the Massachusetts State Attorney General's office.

Deaths 
In 1980, 25-year-old Robert Cooper died of a hemorrhagic bowel obstruction. The institution was criticized for driving him to the hospital in a private vehicle rather than calling for an ambulance.

In 1981, Danny Aswad, a 14-year-old boy with autism, died at the JRC (then called the Behavior Research Institute) while restrained face-down to a bed. The institute was not authorized to use restraints on its residents at that time, and Aswad had previously had a rod surgically implanted in his back to treat a degenerative back disease that had resulted from his treatment there. The coroner's report concluded that Aswad had died of "mental retardation" and "cerebral malformation" and recorded his death as from natural causes.

In 1985, Vincent Milletich, a 22-year-old man with autism, died at the institute. He had been restrained and forced to wear a white noise emitting sensory deprivation helmet when he died of asphyxiation after having an epileptic seizure. Milletich had a history of epileptic seizures, and had been made to wear the helmet as punishment for "making inappropriate sounds". The judge who presided over a hearing on Milletich's death declared that two staff doctors were negligent for approving the therapy, and that the center's director, Matthew Israel, had been negligent in authorizing the helmet's use. Milletich's mother said that she did not want charges pressed against the institute, but did sue the JRC for $10 million.

In 1987, Abigail Gibson, a 29-year-old woman with a seizure disorder, was detained at the Behavioral Research Institute and subject to regular physical aversives by the program there. She had a heart attack in her room at night, and died two days later at Sturdy Memorial Hospital.

In 1990, Linda Cornelison, a 19-year-old non-verbal and intellectually disabled resident, died of complications related to a ruptured bowel. At the time of her death, Cornelison was on a contingent food program where food was withheld as a punishment for undesired behavior. In the days leading up to her death, Cornelison's expressions of pain were interpreted as misbehavior by staff, who administered 56 physical aversives over five hours before calling an ambulance. Cornelison was unconscious when the ambulance arrived. An investigation of Cornelison's death, conducted by the Massachusetts Department of Mental Retardation, reported that the treatment was "inhumane beyond all reason" and violated "universal standards of human decency", but failed to find enough evidence to link the JRC to Cornelison's death. However, a Massachusetts court found in 1995 that the JRC had exhibited negligence. At the time of her death, Cornelison had been a resident of the institute for seven years, and had been subjected to 88,719 aversives.

In 1998, disabled 16-year-old Silverio Gonzalez died in the institute's custody. He was housed there for 11 months before making an attempt to free himself by jumping from a transport bus. He died from head trauma from the fall. His mother, Olga Cepeda, sued the center after his death.

Andre McCollins 
In 2002, a teenager with autism from New York City named Andre McCollins was restrained on a four-point board and shocked 31 times over the course of seven hours. The first shock was given after he did not take off his coat when asked; subsequent shocks were given as punishments for screaming and tensing up while being shocked. In the video, McCollins can be heard shouting "Someone, help me, please!" The JRC staff listed this as a "major disruptive behavior", for which he was administered a GED shock. The day after the incident, McCollins' mother had to drive him to the hospital, as he was unable to speak and had burns on many parts of his body. The doctor diagnosed him with acute stress disorder, which was a direct result of the center's aversives. His mother subsequently claimed that "There is no counseling for the [residents] there... and the staff there lied to [her] all these years..."

In 2012, a video of the incident was released as part of a lawsuit by McCollins' mother, which was settled for an undisclosed sum. The video aired on national news, and caught the attention of the hacker group Anonymous, which announced in a YouTube video that the center and those affiliated with it were targets. Anonymous hacked the JRC's website, retrieved confidential information about individuals and groups associated with it, and posted that information to Pastebin. The doxed information included the names and addresses of the center's sponsors, lobbyists, lawyers, supporters, and founder.

Opposition

Condemnation for torture 
In 2010, the American human rights organization, Disability Rights International, filed an appeal with the office of the United Nations Special Rapporteur on Torture, stating they believed the residents were being subjected to human rights abuses due to the center's use of aversives. The then-Special Rapporteur, Manfred Nowak, sent what he described as "an urgent appeal to the U.S. government asking them to investigate." In 2013, the Special Rapporteur declared that the use of the GED device violated the United Nations Convention Against Torture.

FDA bans the GED 
In April 2014, the United States Food and Drug Administration (FDA) announced a public hearing where a panel of neurological devices experts would consider whether or not the FDA should issue a ban of electric shock aversive conditioning devices like the GED. In April 2016, the FDA took the further step of formally proposing a regulatory ban on electric shock aversive conditioning devices. In 2020 the FDA issued the final rule banning the device with only minor changes from the 2016 draft. The GED was the third medical device ever banned by the FDA in the organization's history. However, the FDA issued an "Administrative Stay" in March 2020, that allowed the center to continue using shock on "individuals who would need a physician-directed plan" indefinitely, pending the end of the COVID-19 pandemic which limited physician contact with many residents. In July 2021, the D.C. Circuit Court of Appeals ruled that the FDA could not issue a "partial stay" but must issue a blanket ban or no ban at all, thus allowing the JRC to continue subjecting 55 people to shock in the meantime.

Attempts to close down the center

First attempt 
Soon after the death of Vincent Milletich in 1985, the Massachusetts Office of Children issued an order to close the center, which was then called the Behavior Research Institute (BRI). The BRI counter-sued the Office of Children, and after seeing the institute's presentation of one of his worst self-harming residents, Judge Ernest Rotenberg sided with the BRI. In the settlement that followed, the Office for Children agreed to pay $580,000 to the BRI in legal fees. The head of the Office of Children later resigned and was sued by a group of parents for $15 million, who claimed that her attempt the shut down the center was a violation of their children's rights. The Behavior Research Institute soon after changed its name to the Judge Rotenberg Center to honor the judge for his ruling.

Second attempt 
In the mid-1990s, the Massachusetts Department of Mental Retardation launched a second attempt to shut down the center. A judge described the case as a "war of harassment" against Matthew Israel and ruled against the attempt to close the center and ordered the state to pay $1.5 million to the JRC in compensation for legal fees and other costs. Additionally, he stripped the agency of its power to regulate the center and awarded it to the courts, and the commissioner of the Department of Mental Retardation was forced to resign.

Further attempts 
Attempts to shut down or limit the JRC at the legislative level have been made in every legislative session since the late 1980s. However, none have passed due to a combination of lobbying from the JRC and the protests of parents. At one time, a group of parents sued the state for $15 million, contending that the state's attempts to close the institute violated their children's rights to treatment. Additionally, Massachusetts state Representative Jeffrey Sanchez, whose nephew, Brandon, has been detained at the JRC since 1992, is a major proponent of the JRC and their practices. Sanchez has repeatedly blocked the passage of legislation that would threaten the center.

Massachusetts State Senator Brian Joyce tried repeatedly during his tenure in office to close down the center without success. He went on to voice his frustration:

There have been repeated attempts to shut down the center by autism rights advocates, disability rights advocates, and human rights advocates. Other notable people who have opposed the center include Ari Ne'eman, Shain Neumeier and Lydia Brown. Organizations that oppose the center include the Autistic Self Advocacy Network, Disability Rights International, and Community Alliance for the Ethical Treatment of Youth.

Financials 
It costs $275,000 per year to keep a resident at the JRC, which is paid for in tax dollars. The center advertises a near-zero rejection rate, and has said that it is a good fit for any teen who is failing school, refusing to attend, or in a psychiatric or correctional setting. The center has sent out promotional materials to various institutions, and has had some success in picking up inmates from New York's juvenile jails and from Rikers Island. Some residents are sent to there by the foster care system.  the JRC had an annual revenue of $70 million.

The JRC is incorporated as a tax-exempt nonprofit organization. In 2020, it received $1.7 million in COVID-19 relief funds.

Overbilling 
In 2006, it was found that 14 of the center's 17 psychologists, including the director of psychology, lacked proper licenses. Because the state reimburses the JRC for services rendered by doctors, the JRC had overbilled the state by nearly $800,000.  the state had not collected the money. For misrepresenting licensing status of the psychologists, the Board of Registration of Psychologists fined the JRC $43,000, and Matthew Israel $29,600.

Lobbying 
The center regularly lobbies the government to prevent the passage of legislation that could threaten it. In 2010, it spent over $100,000 to lobby against the passage of a bill that would have made the use of electric shocks illegal. The center has also lobbied against bills that would have banned the use of restraints and other aversives in Massachusetts schools.  the JRC had spent over $1 million on lobbying efforts.

Legal 
In 2007, the JRC spent $2.8 million in legal fees.

Advertising and promotion 
In 2008, the JRC spent over $390,000 on advertising and promotion. The JRC advertises at psychiatric and juvenile justice conferences, where it attempts to get professionals to recommend the institution to parents and guardians. It also places ads on New York City radio. If a parent or guardian expresses interest in the center, a JRC recruiter will contact them to provide gifts and promotional materials. They will also help the parents sue their school district into paying the JRC's tuition and housing fees.

Salaries 
In 2007, Matthew Israel was paid $321,000.

Lawsuits

By JRC 
In 1986, the institute filed a lawsuit for $15 million against the director of the Massachusetts Office of Children, alleging that her attempt to shut the center down was a violation of the residents' rights. Several critics of the JRC claim that the center harassed them, and that it sued them for defamation or threatened to sue them if they did not revoke their statements. According to Disability Rights International, former residents, teachers, state officials, and legal advocates have expressed fear about publicly criticizing the JRC. The JRC has filed numerous other lawsuits.

By parents 
Some parents and former residents have filed lawsuits against the JRC. In 2006, the family of Evelyn Nicholson sued the center over the use of electric shocks, claiming that the treatment was inhumane and violated her civil rights. The lawsuit was later settled for $65,000. The mother of Andre McCollins sued the center, settling in 2012 for an undisclosed sum. Some parents have filed and won lawsuits against their local school districts to keep their children enrolled at JRC.

Enrollment 
Under the Individuals with Disabilities Education Act, the federal government requires that all states must provide a "free and appropriate" education to all students. Any school district that cannot provide an appropriate education to a student is required to send that student to an approved school that can. The JRC helps families sue their school district to send their children there. It also frequently sues school districts and states to keep individuals at the JRC after they turn 21.

Company culture 
Employees are encouraged to file anonymous reports against each other, and are forbidden from making casual conversation. The negative write-ups that result from these anonymous reports are called "performance improvement opportunities". Sometimes management will direct an employee to bait another into breaking the rules as a test to see if they will do it. For example, an employee might try to start a casual conversation with another employee at the direction of management. The conversation will be recorded so that staff caught breaking the rules may be disciplined.

Residents are also restricted from socializing with each other.

All employees must sign an agreement, which claims to be legally binding, not to talk publicly about the JRC, even after they no longer work there.

Resident demographics 
 nearly 90% of the center's residents were from New York City, and about 90% of the residents were racial minorities.

See also 
 ABA International
 Unethical human experimentation in the United States
 World Wide Association of Specialty Programs and Schools

Abuse 
 Child abuse
 Disability abuse
 Institutional abuse

Torture 
 Medical torture
 Pain compliance
 Torture in the United States

Other human rights movements 
 Antipsychiatry
 Children's rights movement
 Human rights movement
 Psychiatric survivors movement

References

Further reading

External links 
 

Ableism
Autism pseudoscience
Behavior modification
Educational institutions established in 1971
Human rights abuses in the United States
Medical controversies in the United States
Medical scandals in the United States
School violence
Special schools in the United States
Therapeutic boarding schools in the United States
Torture
Torture in the United States
Torture-related organizations
Violence against children
Violence against disabled people